The Bürgenstock is a mountain in Switzerland ( above sea level). It is located partway along the shore of Lake Lucerne. Bürgenstock is also a resort located at 874 m a.s.l. on the same mountain. The lookout point at the summit of the Bürgenstock is the Hammetschwand. The mountain is almost entirely surrounded by Lake Lucerne.

The small resort of Bürgenstock can be reached by road or with the Bürgenstock Funicular, which starts from the boat landing pier at Kehrsiten-Bürgenstock on Lake Lucerne. The highest summit of the Bürgenstock can be reached from the resort by foot and by means of a cliff-side path followed by the Hammetschwand Elevator.

Description 
When viewed from Lucerne, the Bürgenstock has the typical mountain shape of a "Stock". In the German-speaking part of Switzerland, the term "Stock" is used for a number of mountains whose shape of summits are clearly set off from the bulk. A good example is Stockhütte.

The term Bürgenstock, composed of the descriptive words "Bürgen" and "Stock", has evolved since the mid-19th century into the geographical name for the distinctive mountain on the "Bürgen" peninsula as seen from Lucerne.

From the early Middle Ages on, the mountain on this peninsula was called Bürgenberg; an arbitral settlement from the year 1378, putting an end to over 38 years of dispute between the Lucerne and Nidwalden estates about the affiliation of the region extending from Kehrsiten to Mattgrat, uses the name Bürgenberg in its records.

Old maps and frontier records of the Corporation of Lucerne, which mention the – in those times – disputed forest call it the Stadtwald am Bürgenberg (forest on the Bürgenberg) or Bürgenbergwald (Bürgen mountain forest).

On the Dufourkarte (Dufour Map), the topographic map of Switzerland from 1844 to 1864, the mountain ridge as a whole had no name. The highest crest was referred to as Hametschwand.

The geographical name Bürgenstock was first documented in 1836 by Aloys Businger in his book “Der Kanton Unterwalden”. Businger calls the entire Bürgen peninsula the Bürgenberg. However, he refers to the highest elevation both as Hammetschwand and Bürgenstock.

In addition, in the year 1850, the Director of the Lucerne Teachers' Training College Niklaus Rietschi published a private map, in which the terms Bürgenstock together with the term Hammetschwand are recorded for the summit.

In 1872, the company Bucher & Durrer laid the foundation for the hotel complex on the Alp Tritt. For this purpose, it chose the already existing geographical name of Bürgenstock, also documented in 1836 by Aloys Businger in his book “Der Kanton Unterwalden”.

The first official map to use the geographical name Bürgenstock was the so-called "Siegfriedkarte" Siegfried Map, whose publication, started by the Federal Topographic Bureau under Hermann Siegfried, continued from 1870 until 1926. The name Bürgenstock appears on sheet 377 of the Siegfried Map and dates back to 1896.

Around 1900, the designation Bürgenstock established itself as a general colloquial term for the entire mountain ridge, from Stansstad in the West to "Untere Nase" in the East. A corresponding entry in the "Geographischen Lexikon der Schweiz" (Geographical Dictionary of Switzerland) can be found in 1910.

In the Swiss maps of our days, the name Bürgenstock designates the mountain ridge – with the term Hammetschwand as an alternative – as well as the location of the hotel and residential complex. Bürgenstock, as a geographical name, can be found twice in the official Swiss index of cities and towns. The locality Bürgenstock is listed in the postal code listing of Switzerland under the postal code 6363. Today, the residential streets of the valley communities Stansstad and Ennetbürgen, connecting the entire mountain ridge, carry the name Bürgenstockstrasse.

Geographical situation 
The northern slope drops very steeply into the lake. On and at the bottom of the southern slope is the township of Ennetbürgen; Stansstad is situated at the bottom of the western end.

For the most part, the mountain belongs to the municipality of Ennetbürgen in the canton of Nidwalden. The western part belongs to the municipality of Stansstad. A part of the northern steep drop into the lake is an exclave of the city of Lucerne and is called Bürgenberg (aka citizen's mountain).

Geology 
Geologically, the Bürgenstock belongs to the foothills of the Pilatus and the Helvetic border chain. The rocks are from the Cretaceous and Tertiary. Below the Hammetschwand, the following layers can be distinguished on the north side: siliceous limestone, Drusberg layers (forming a forest belt), bright Schrattenkalk limestone with orbitolina layers overlaid by Seewerkalk limestone.

Above this, there is a transgression of Assilina Greensand and Nummulitic limestone of Lutetian age, which is found mainly on the southern downward slope with its gentler incline.

During the last ice age, the Bürgenstock was completely covered by an ice stream flowing from the Gotthard into the foothills of the Alps. Abrasion marks left by the ice on the limestone are found including in the highest altitudes. Large granite boulders which were transported by the ice from the Gotthard, are distributed over the whole mountain, as for example an 18 m3 large, round specimen on a steep slope on the Allwägli land reserve, which in 1949 was placed under protection. After the regression of the ice, the Bürgenstock was at first an island in Lake Lucerne. In the course of a few thousand years, however, the Engelberger Aa River filled up the area between the Engelberger valley entrance and the Bürgenstock with sediments, creating today's flat valley between the townships Ennetbürgen, Buochs, Stans and Stansstad.

Tourism 
Home to a number of luxury hotels and a conference centre, the Bürgenstock has been a popular holiday and conference destination since 1872. Also located on the Bürgenstock is Europe's tallest outdoor lift: the Hammetschwand Lift connects the beautiful scenic cliff path with the Hammetschwand vantage point, from where extensive views of Lake Lucerne and the surrounding mountains are to be had.

A protection plan is in place for the Bürgenstock to safeguard its testimony to Switzerland's post-Second World War tourism heritage. Alongside the Grand Hotel and Palace Hotel, this comprises numerous smaller buildings erected in the 1950s and 1960s. The Office of Historical Monuments of the canton of Nidwalden, the owners, Nidwalden's cantonal council and the municipality's government sought successfully to preserve the historical buildings by establishing a committee mandated with developing a master plan to place the buildings under heritage protection. The historical weather station has since been relocated to a different site.

History of the hotel complex 
In 1871, the Bucher & Durrer Company, domiciled in Kerns, bought Alp Tritt on Mount Bürgenberg. The company named its new hotel venture "Bürgenstock". The Hotel Kurhaus, later called the Grand Hotel, opened on 23 June 1873. A small hydroelectric power plant on the Engelberger Aa river was built in Buochs in 1886/7 to power the Bürgenstock funicular railway and the Stanserhorn aerial cableway. The railway commenced operations in 1888, as did the hotel's own water supply. That same year saw the opening of the Park Hotel. The Bürgenstock Chapel dates from 1897. The Palace Hotel opened in 1904, and a number of villas emerged east of it between 1900 and 1905. The Hammetschwand Lift was inaugurated in 1905.

Friedrich Frey-Fürst bought the Bürgenstock hotels in 1925. The period 1925 to 1948 saw the three hotels subjected to thoroughgoing renovations and the golf course opened in 1928. Friedrich Frey-Fürst died in 1953, at which point his son Fritz Frey took charge under whose direction various structural and infrastructural changes were made. During his tenure and that of his family, celebrities including actors Sophia Loren, Audrey Hepburn and Sean Connery and politicians such as Jimmy Carter and Henry Kissinger stayed as guests at the hotels.

The family sold the Bürgenstock Resort to the UBS in 1996. It was acquired in 2000 by Richemont Héritage SA of Vich, Canton Vaud together with five other five-star hotels indebted to the UBS to the tune of some CHF 115 million. The company changed its name to Rosebud Hotels Holding SA in 2003 after disposing of its eponymous Hotel Richemont. The Barwa Real Estate Company, domiciled in the Emirate of Qatar, took up a 50% holding in the company's assets in 2007 which, alongside the Bürgenstock hotels, comprised the Schweizerhof in Bern and the Royal-Savoy in Lausanne. On separating from Rosebud Hotels Holding SA in 2008, the Barwa Real Estate Company became sole proprietor of the Bürgenstock Resort. There followed a new concept under manager Bruno H. Schöpfer. In 2009 the Barwa Real Estate Company transferred its Swiss hotel portfolio to the Qatari Diar Real Estate Investment Company, which is wholly owned by the State of Qatar; its subsidiary, QDHP Swiss Management AG, became responsible for managing the hotel projects. Katara Hospitality, a subsidiary of the Qatar Investment Authority – the State of Qatar's sovereign wealth fund – became the new investor in 2011. The same year saw the launch of the Bürgenstock Selection brand identity, which incorporates the new Bürgenstock Resort, the Hotel Royal-Savoy in Lausanne and the Hotel Schweizerhof in Bern. The Swiss activities were transferred in 2012 to Katara Hospitality Switzerland AG; domiciled in Zug, the company operates the hotels in Switzerland. Since 2013, 72 of the 74 building licences applied for have been issued and more than CHF 500 million invested.

The Hotel Honegg has been renovated and reopened in 2011.

The Bürgenstock resort opened in 2017.

Politics 
At the beginning of 2002, the parties involved in Sudan's civil war signed the Bürgenstock Agreement on the Bürgenstock.

In spring 2004, Bürgenstock was the site for negotiations between Turkish and Greek Cypriots on the issue of accession to the EU.

Culture 
The 19th century Bürgenstock Chapel is located in immediate vicinity of the hotels and at the beginning of the cliff path on the Bürgenstock. It is still owned by the former hotelier family Frey, who left their mark on the Bürgenstock hotels from 1925 to 1997, as well as the non-profit Frey-Fürst Foundation. The Bürgenstock Chapel is a replica of the chapel of St. Jost which lies on the slopes of the Bürgenstock Mountain on the territory of the township of Ennetbürgen and is the oldest Gothic sanctuary in the Swiss canton of Nidwaldens. The Bürgenstock Chapel was built in 1897 under the orders of Countess Tancrède de la Baume, née Pozzo di Borgo, who had set up her summer residence in the hotel village on the Bürgenstock. Among other things, she had an ornate wooden, polychrome Gothic ceiling reproduced in detail in the chapel. Further elements of interior design and decoration are also replicas from the 17th century and are from different churches in Switzerland. The sculpture "Dance of Death" by the Swiss sculptor Hans Jörg Limbach (1928-1990) is located directly next to the chapel. The Bürgenstock Chapel also became famous because of the wedding of actress Audrey Hepburn with Mel Ferrer in 1954.

The rich cultural tradition established in the 19th and 20th centuries on the Bürgenstock is continued today by several private and independent cultural organisations:

On 13 November 2009, the "Bürgenstock Kunst- und Kulturstiftung" (Bürgenstock Foundation of Art and Culture) - located in Ennetbürgen - was founded to preserve historical furniture and antiques from the hotels built in the 19th century on the Bürgenstock. Around 8000 people visited the special exhibition   honouring the foundation: titled Zukunft hat Herkunft – Grand Hotellerie von einst und morgen (1870–2014) (Provenance with a future – Grand Hotellerie yesterday and tomorrow), it ran at the Palace Hotel from June to December 2011 and featured exhibits from Switzerland's hospitality legacy. The foundation joined forces with the University of Teacher Education Lucerne to realise an educational trail on the Cliff Path. 1.5 kilometres in length, it was opened on 26 June 2015.

The "Stiftung Bürgenstock Momente" (Foundation Bürgenstock Moments) was created on 11 May 2012 with the aim of implementing cultural events and concerts, also at the historic site of the Bürgenstock Chapel. Under the direction of Peter Frey – a descendant of the former hotelier family – the Stiftung Bürgenstock Momente has its seat directly in the village of Bürgenstock and attracts music fans from around the world to the Bürgenstock, with its yearly week of classical music called "Carnival of the Stradivari", amongst others.

See also
List of mountains of Switzerland accessible by public transport

References

External links 
 Hammetschwand Elevator
 Bürgenstock Funicular
 Golf Club Bürgenstock
 Bürgenstock on Hikr
 Foundation Bürgenstock Moments
 Bürgenstock Kunst- und Kulturstiftung
 Villa Honegg
 

Mountains of the Alps
Mountains of Switzerland
Mountains of the canton of Lucerne
Mountains of Nidwalden
Lucerne–Nidwalden border
One-thousanders of Switzerland